Chorus Anyone is a Canadian music television series which aired on CBC Television in 1964.

Premise
This Vancouver-produced series was hosted by Edward Greenhalgh and regularly featured a 12-member men's choir directed by John Avison. Avison also appeared on the series with Hugh McLean to perform piano duets. Each episode featured a particular theme on which the songs were based such as the sea or campfire music. Guest vocalists during the series run included Jan Rubeš.

Scheduling
This half-hour series was broadcast on Sundays at 7:30 p.m. (Eastern) from June 28 to September 13, 1964.

References

External links
 

CBC Television original programming
1960s Canadian music television series
1964 Canadian television series debuts
1964 Canadian television series endings
Black-and-white Canadian television shows
Television shows filmed in Vancouver